Walkers of Warrington was a brewery in Warrington, England.

History
The company was established by Peter Walker in 1846, when he acquired Pemberton's Brewery in Warrington and, having admitted his son Andrew to the business, started trading as Peter Walker & Son. The company became Walkers of Warrington in 1864. It merged with Cains Brewery to form Walker Cains in 1921, and then with Joshua Tetley & Son to form Tetley Walker in 1960.

Sources

Companies based in Warrington
Defunct breweries of the United Kingdom